Lexia may refer to:

Lexia (typeface)
Lexia, Western Australia

See also
Node (textual)
Lexias (archdukes), a genus of tropical forest-dwelling butterflies